Samuel Oludele Ogundeji is an Anglican bishop in Nigeria: he is the current Bishop of Egba West.

He became Bishop of Egba West in 2010 on the retirement of Samuel Ajani.

Notes

Living people
Anglican bishops of Egba West
21st-century Anglican bishops in Nigeria
Year of birth missing (living people)